Marco Spissu (born February 5, 1995) is an Italian professional basketball player for Reyer Venezia Mestre of the Italian Lega Basket Serie A (LBA) and the EuroCup. Spissu usually plays as point guard.

Professional career
In July 2016, Spissu was sent on loan to Virtus Bologna of the Serie A2 Basket.  With Bologna, he won the Italian LNP Cup and he was named the LNP Cup Finals MVP.

After 11 years with Dinamo Sassari, from 2011, Spissu moved in Spain to Unicaja Málaga, signing a two years contract. On August 12, 2021, Unicaja Malaga voids Marco Spissu’s contract after Italian player fails physicals. The Italian Basketball Federation intervened in his favour by stating that his physical conditions were adequate and no injuries has compromised his condition, such that he was called for the Tokyo Olympics. Standing to Gazzetta dello sport, the Italian sport newspaper, the Malaga management team had second thoughts about the deal and used his physical condition as a justification for voiding the contract. 

In the end, on August 19, 2021, Spissu signed with the Russian team UNICS Kazan of the VTB United League and newly promoted to the EuroLeague.

He left the team in early 2022 due to the 2022 Russian invasion of Ukraine.

On July 20, 2022, he has signed with Reyer Venezia Mestre of the Italian Lega Basket Serie A (LBA).

Honours
Virtus Bologna
Italian LNP Cup: 2017
Italian LNP Cup MVP: 2017
Dinamo Sassari
FIBA Europe Cup: 2018–19

References

External links
 FIBA profile

1995 births
Living people
Basketball players at the 2020 Summer Olympics
BC UNICS players
Dinamo Sassari players
Italian men's basketball players
Lega Basket Serie A players
Olympic basketball players of Italy
People from Sassari
Point guards
Reyer Venezia players
Sportspeople from Sardinia
Viola Reggio Calabria players
Virtus Bologna players